The women's 1500 metres at the 2012 African Championships in Athletics was held at the Stade Charles de Gaulle on 29 June.

Medalists

Records

Schedule

Results

Final

References

Results

1500 Women
1500 metres at the African Championships in Athletics
2012 in women's athletics